The Misadventures of the Dunderheads, also known as Montana Amazon, is a 2012 American independent black comedy road feature film starring Olympia Dukakis, Haley Joel Osment, and Alison Brie.

Plot
The Dunderheads are an eccentric Montana family who've been in the mountains far too long. Now one step ahead of the law, matriarch Grandma Ira careens across the American West with her two wildly dysfunctional teenage grandkids.

Cast
Olympia Dukakis- Ira Dunderhead
Haley Joel Osment - Womple Dunderhead
Alison Brie - Ella Dunderhead
Veronica Cartwright - Margaret
Ellen Geer - Vernice
Lew Temple - Trevor
Angel Oquendo - Panicky Richard
James MacDonald - Heirik

Reception
The finished film premiered in October 2012 at the Los Angeles Femme International Film Festival where its director, D.G. Brock, won the Best Feature Film Director award. The film was shown theatrically in art houses across the South by The Southern Circuit in March and April 2013. It was shown on the Starz Movie Channels from 2013 through August 2014.

References

2012 films
2012 black comedy films
2012 independent films
2010s comedy road movies
American black comedy films
American independent films
American comedy road movies
2010s English-language films
Films about dysfunctional families
Films about siblings
Films shot in California
Murder in films
2010s American films